Rangitane Will Norton  (born 30 March 1942), commonly known as Tane Norton, is a former New Zealand rugby union player. He played at the hooker position. He played for Linwood before he first represented  in 1969. In 1977, he captained the All Blacks to a series win over the British Lions and played three games for the World Invitation XV in South Africa.

In the 2006 New Year Honours, Norton was appointed a Member of the New Zealand Order of Merit, for services to rugby.

In 1973 and 1974, he was awarded the Tom French Cup for the outstanding Māori player of the year.

See also
1977 British Lions tour to New Zealand

References

External links

 

1942 births
Living people
New Zealand international rugby union players
Members of the New Zealand Order of Merit
New Zealand rugby union players
Rugby union hookers
Māori All Blacks players
People from Waikari
Rugby union players from Canterbury, New Zealand